EP is an EP by Scottish post-rock group Mogwai, released in various countries in 1999.

Overview
The EP features four tracks, "Stanley Kubrick" (recorded at Sub Station Studio in Cowdenbeath, Scotland and produced by Michael Brennan Jr., assisted by Kevin Lynch), "Christmas Song", "Burn Girl Prom Queen", and "Rage:Man" (all recorded at CaVa Studios in Glasgow, Scotland, and also produced by Michael Brennan Jr., assisted by Tony Doogan and Willie Deans). The US release of EP is titled EP+2, due to the two bonus tracks, "Rollerball", and "Small Children in the Background", both from No Education = No Future (Fuck the Curfew), which was not released in the US. All four tracks on EP were later included on the 2000 compilation album, EP+6. The cover of EP is similar to the cover of EP+6, as they both feature the  same image, a movie still entitled "Watertower" by Scottish photographer Neale Smith, of a Water tower in East Kilbride, South Lanarkshire, Scotland. Stuart Braithwaite has commented on EP, saying:

Track listing
All songs and music were written by Mogwai.
"Stanley Kubrick" – 4:17
"Christmas Song" – 3:24
"Burn Girl Prom Queen" – 8:31
"Rage:Man" – 5:03

Personnel
 Stuart Braithwaite – guitar
 Dominic Aitchison – bass guitar
 Martin Bulloch – drums
 John Cummings – guitar, piano
 Barry Burns – guitar, keyboard
 Lee Cohen – vocals on "Stanley Kubrick"
 The Cowdenbeath Brass Band – brass on "Burn Girl Prom Queen"
 Michael Brennan Jr. – producer
 Kevin Lynch – assistant producer on "Stanley Kubrick"
 Tony Doogan – assistant producer on tracks 2–4
 Willie Deans – assistant producer on tracks 2–4

Release history
EP was released in various countries in 1999.

Notes

External links

Mogwai EPs
1999 EPs